Hurry On Down is a cassette by the New Zealand musician Alastair Galbraith released in 1988. The first edition was entirely recorded on a Walkman. Most of Side A was re-recorded on a 4-track for the second edition released in 1990. Side B was recorded live at 3am at the Regent Theatre 24-hour book sale. Most of the songs were later performed by Plagal Grind. The cover photograph was taken on the St David Street footbridge.

Track listing for the 1st edition
Side A
 "Indigo Journeyman"
 "Bravely Bravely"
 "Receivership"
 "Mrs Blücher"
 "Iron Tender"
 "More Than Magnetic"
 "Swallow"
 "Mavis Grind"

Side B
 "Stormed Port"
 "Starless Road"
 "River Chasm"
 "Portrait Of A Lady"
 "I Don´t Get You"
 "Many A One Has"
 "Yes Jazz Cactus"
 "Timebomb"
 "Ether"

Track listing for the 2nd edition
Side A
 "Indigo Journeyman" - 02:37
 "Iron Tender" - 03:56
 "Mavis Grind" - 03:15
 "Swallow" - 00:53
 "Old Screaming Eenie" - 03:13
 "Cranes" - 02:36
 "Mrs Blücher" - 02:36
 "More Than Magnetic" - 01:42

Side B
 "Stormed Port" - 01:02
 "Starless Road" - 01:57
 "River Chasm" - 03:58
 "Portrait Of A Lady" - 02:54
 "I Don´t Get You" - 02:04
 "Many A One Has" - 02:05
 "Yes Jazz Cactus" - 01:30
 "Timebomb" - 01:59
 "Ether" - 03:16

Personnel
Alastair Galbraith (guitar, vocals)
Helga Hunke (accordion)
Graeme Jefferies (guitar) (first edition only)
Robbie Muir (bass guitar) (second edition only)
Bruce Russell (spoken word)
Peter Jefferies (percussion) (second edition only)

References

Alastair Galbraith (musician) albums
1987 albums